Jesper Eliasson (born 21 March 2000) is a Swedish professional ice hockey goaltender currently playing for Stjernen Hockey of the Eliteserien (Norway). He was drafted 84th overall by the Detroit Red Wings in the 2018 NHL Entry Draft.

Playing career
During the 2018–19 season, Eliasson played in 33 games in his first full season with the Växjö Lakers J20 in the J20 SuperElit. Eliasson registered a 2.43 goals-against average (GAA) for the Lakers, which ranked seventh in the league, and had a .919 save percentage, tied for fourth in the league.

Eliasson made his professional debut for the Växjö Lakers of the Swedish Hockey League (SHL) during the 2019–20 season, appearing in one game. On 6 June 2019, Eliasson was loaned from Växjö Lakers to Almtuna IS of HockeyAllsvenskan. During the 2019–20 season, Eliasson appeared in 25 games for Almtuna, where he posted a 7–18–0 record, with a 3.09 GAA, and .887 save percentage.

On 8 April 2020, Eliasson signed with Färjestad BK of the SHL. On 2 October 2020, Eliasson was loaned from Färjestad BK to EC Red Bull Salzburg of the ICEHL.

International play

Eliasson represented Sweden at the 2018 IIHF World U18 Championships where he appeared in one game, with a 3.00 GAA, .885 save percentage, and won a bronze medal. Eliasson represented Sweden at the 2020 World Junior Ice Hockey Championships where he appeared in one game, with a 2.00 GAA, .895 save percentage, and won a bronze medal.

Career statistics

Regular season and playoffs

International

References

External links
 

2000 births
Living people
Almtuna IS players
Detroit Red Wings draft picks
EC Red Bull Salzburg players
IF Troja/Ljungby players
People from Eksjö Municipality
Stjernen Hockey players
Swedish ice hockey goaltenders
Väsby IK players
Växjö Lakers players
Sportspeople from Jönköping County